The 2002–03 Minnesota Golden Gophers men's ice hockey season was the 82nd season of play for the program and 44th in the WCHA. The Golden Gophers represented the University of Minnesota, played their home games at the Mariucci Arena and were coached by Don Lucia, in his 4th season.

Season
Fresh off of the program's fourth national title, the first in 23 years, Minnesota entered the season with high hopes. Though the team lost several key players to graduation, including Hobey Baker Award-winner Jordan Leopold, they brought in an impressive collection of young talent. Perhaps the brightest young star that had ever donned the maroon and gold to that point, Thomas Vanek debuted for the team and Gophers would need the highly-regarded Austrian to make up for the lost offensive production of the departed John Pohl and Jeff Taffe.

Though the Gophers were ranked #1 entering the year, that was due mostly to their being the defending champions. The Gophers suffered a setback when Team captain Grant Potulny was injured in the first game against Ohio State. What was initially thought to just be a fractured fibula that would keep him out for 4-6 weeks turned out to include ligament damage that would sideline Potulny for up to 4 months. Without him, the team looked a little out of sorts as the roster sought to soldier on. While Minnesota never looked bad, they weren't able to consistently put together a good stretch of games in the first two months of the season. Part of the problem was that Don Lucia was still trying to find out which one of his two goaltenders deserved to be the starter. Both Travis Weber and Justin Johnson got playing time but neither was able to seize control of the Minnesota cage by mid-November. The goalie rotation continued until Johnson had a rather a poor outing against Colorado College which was followed up by a solid performance by Weber. Afterwards, Weber remained in the cage and strung several good outings together, including a road sweep of long time rival Wisconsin.

While Weber established himself in the cage, the offense too had steadily come along. The Gophers had shown from the start that the team could score but they had trouble with their consistency. With Vanek at the lead, the Gophers steadily improved throughout the fall and turned themselves into one of the best offenses in the country come winter time. While the team sorted through its early-season jitters, their ranking declined. When December rolled around the team had dropped to #10, however, because the NCAA tournament had expanded to 16 teams for that season, they were still in a solid position to earn a berth. The Gophers took no chances, however, and reeled off a series of impressive wins to jump up to 4th by the time January rolled around.

The team was stymied when they began the second half of the season and went winless in three games. They arrested their fall with a win over top-ranked North Dakota and then mostly held serve over the following month and a half. Entering the final few weeks of the season, Minnesota sat 7th in the polls but had a tremendous opportunity to move up with four games against ranked teams. Minnesota went 2–0–2 in those games, which, though they did not see their ranking improve, they were able to finish in a tie for second in the WCHA standings.

Conference tournament
Because they held the tie-breaker, the Gophers received the second seed for the WCHA tournament and got to take on a bad but improving Michigan Tech squad. The Gophers won the first game fairly easily and appeared to be heading to a sweep in the second when Weber suffered an injury to his finger. Johnson was installed for the remainder of the contest and though the Gophers marched on to the semifinals, doing so without their starting goalie was not ideal. Though he was initially expected to be ready for the next game, Weber was unable to play against Minnesota State–Mankato. Seeing their backup needed a hand, Minnesota's offense shelled the Maverick cage, firing 49 shots to MSU's 17. Due to a masterful performance from opposing netminder Jon Volp, however, the two still needed overtime to settle the score. Just less than 4 minutes into the extra session, Vanek scored his 26th goal of the season and sent the Gophers to the championship match.

Colorado College was all that stood between Minnesota and a conference title. The top-seeded Tigers were the favorites to win but it was the Gophers who got off to a blazing start. Potulny had a hand in all three of Minnesota's goals in the first period to build a huge lead. The Tigers fought back with two power play goals in the second half of the game along with 38 shots but Johnson held the fort and enabled the Gophers to skate away with a 4–2 win.

NCAA tournament
Because they were hosting one of the four regionals, Minnesota was going to be placed in the West bracket. The WCHA championship helped Minnesota earn one of the #1 seeds and an advantageous match for the first round. Additionally, because two of the teams seeded 4th were also members of the WCHA, Minnesota was assigned to play Mercyhurst. While the Lakers won their conference tournament, they weren't considered much of a threat to the Gophers. With the return of Weber between the pipes and Potulny netting a hat-trick, Minnesota proved those sentiments correct with a resounding 9–2 victory.

Minnesota's second game was expected to be a much closer affair as they were taking on #6 Ferris State. The Bulldogs were led by Hobey Baker finalist Chris Kunitz and gave the Gophers a demonstration of his abilities when he scored twice in the first period. Fortunately for Minnesota, they scored five times in the opening frame and cruised to a 7–4 victory.

The national semifinal saw Minnesota fight and law back from the brink of disaster. Facing off against #4 Michigan, the Gophers were badly outplayed in the first period and found themselves down by a goal. A Jed Ortmeyer score after the mid-way point of the game put the Wolverines up by two and had Minnesota staring into the void. Troy Riddle cut the lead in half on a rebound from Vanek before the end of the second while a marker less than two minutes into the third from Gino Guyer tied the score. Chris Harrington took two separate minor penalties afterwards but the Minnesota penalty kill held and kept the game knotted at 2-all. Overtime was required and both teams found it difficult to get the puck on the goal. In almost 9 minutes only 5 shots were recorded but it was the last one from Vanek that counted and sent Minnesota to the championship game.

The final game of the year came against New Hampshire in a rematch from earlier in the season. Minnesota carried the balance of play but Mike Ayers put up a strong performance in goal for the Wildcats and kept his team in the game. After two periods, Minnesota was leading on the shot clock 30–16 but the teams remained tied with one goal apiece. As time went on, it was just one mistake that separated Minnesota from disaster but, as he had most of the season, Thomas Vanek stepped in as the hero. Just past the 8-minute mark, Vanek broke the tie and then assisted on a second goal just 3 minutes later. After a power play goal from Barry Tallackson, Minnesota suddenly had a commanding 3-goal lead. New Hampshire desperately tried to tie the game but they had been outmatched on the ice all night. Pulling their goalie only allowed the Gophers to score a 5th goal and ensure the team a national championship. Minnesota was the first team in over 30 years to defend their national title.

Departures

Recruiting

Roster
April 15, 2003.

Season standings 
Note: PTS = Points; GP = Games played; W = Wins; L = Losses; T = Ties; GF = Goals for; GA = Goals against

Schedule and results

|-
!colspan=12 style="color:white; background:#862334; " | Regular season

|-
!colspan=12 style="color:white; background:#862334; " | 

|-
!colspan=12 style="color:white; background:#862334; " | 

|-
!colspan=12 style="color:white; background:#862334; " | 

|- align="center" bgcolor="#e0e0e0"
|colspan=11|Minnesota Won Series 2-0

|-
!colspan=12 style="color:white; background:#862334; " |

NCAA Championship

(W1) Minnesota vs. (NE1) New Hampshire

Scoring statistics

Goaltending statistics

Awards and honors

Players drafted into the NHL

2003 NHL Entry Draft

† incoming freshman

References

External Links
Official website

Minnesota Golden Gophers men's ice hockey seasons
Minnesota
Minnesota
Minnesota
Minnesota
Minnesota
Minnesota